Erlend Haraldsson  (c.1124 – 21 December 1154) was joint Earl of Orkney from 1151 to 1154. The son of Earl Harald Haakonsson, he ruled with Harald Maddadsson and Rögnvald Kali Kolsson.

This was a turbulent period of Orcadian history. Erlend's claim to the earldom was strong, his father having been earl before him but as happened on several previous occasions, rulership of the islands had become divided.   His father had been poisoned c. 1130 when Erlend was still a child and after the death of Erlend's uncle, Paul Haakonsson, the earldom had become shared between Rögnvald and Harald "the Old" Maddadsson. Earl Rögnvald left Orkney in 1151 to go on a pilgrimage to the Holy Land and Erlend acted quickly to build on his inheritance. He obtained half of his father's lands in Caithness from the king of Scotland and claimed half of Orkney as well. Earl Harald refused, so Erlend set sail to Norway to request his share from King Eystein Haraldsson.

The King granted Erlend Harald Maddadsson's share of the Orkney earldom, which led to a series of skirmishes between the two. Erlend had the support of Sweyn Asleifsson, a powerful Viking leader, which enabled him to defend himself for a while against the combined forces of Harald and, on his return, Earl Rögnvald. However, their men eventually killed Erlend during a raid on the island of Damsay on the night of 21 December 1154.

Sources
The primary source for information about Erlend's life is the Orkneyinga saga, which was first compiled in Iceland in the early 13th century. Much of the information it contains about the early period of Norse history in Orkney is "hard to corroborate" although the proximity of Erlend's floruit to the time when this Norse saga was compiled in written form may lend weight to its authenticity with respect to this period.

References

Notes

Citations

General references
 Muir, Tom (2005) Orkney in the Sagas: The Story of the Earldom of Orkney as told in the Icelandic Sagas. The Orcadian. Kirkwall. .
 Thomson, William P. L. (2008) The New History of Orkney, Edinburgh, Birlinn. 
 Woolf, Alex (2007) From Pictland to Alba, 789–1070. Edinburgh. Edinburgh University Press. 

Earls of Orkney
12th-century rulers in Europe
Year of death unknown
Year of birth unknown
Mormaers of Caithness
12th-century mormaers